Sulaymaniyah Stadium, is a multi-use stadium in Sulaimaniyah, Iraq. It is currently used mostly for football matches and serves as the home stadium of Sulaymaniyah FC. In 2017, Sulaymaniyah Stadium became the first stadium in the Kurdistan Region of Iraq to be internationally recognized by the Asian Football Confederation. One of the major stadiums in the Kurdistan Region, it has hosted a number of pro-independence rallies since 2017. It is also the temporary home of Newroz SC as of 2021 while the club's home stadium is under construction. The stadium holds 15,000 people.

References

See also 
List of football stadiums in Iraq

Football venues in Iraq
Football venues in Iraqi Kurdistan
Multi-purpose stadiums in Iraq
Sulaymaniyah